The 49th State Hawaii Record Company is a defunct Hawaiian record label specializing in traditional Hawaiian music. Established in 1948 by George K. Ching, the label was purchased by Cord International in the early 1990s.

History 
The 49th State Hawaii Record Company was founded in Honolulu, Hawaii by record store owner George K. Ching in 1948. The label was named in anticipation of Hawaii's eventual attainment of statehood, though Alaska gained statehood eight months before Hawaii, making Hawaii the 50th state. Ching founded the label to answer the growing demand for traditional Hawaiian music in his record store, with the first 49th State recordings released as 78 rpm records made using an acetate record cutting machine in a makeshift studio in Ching's own home. Later, production moved to initial recording on tape before later being pressed in vinyl. To guarantee authenticity in recorded performances, Ching collaborated with Hawaiian composter and musician Johnny Almeida, known as the "Dean of Hawaiian Music". Almeida served as the label's music director. 49th State served as a successor to Bell Records Honolulu, which released Hawaiian music between 1944 and 1950. By 1950, the headquarters for the label had moved from Ching's home to 1121 Bethel St, Honolulu. The company, which has been described as "the first, top, most significant, authentic label of Hawaii", was defunct by 1958.

Purchase by Cord International
Cord International purchased the rights to The 49th State Hawaii record company and has restored and re-mastered many of the LPs released between 1948 and 1958.  According to the May 18, 2015 obituary of Michael Cord: 
"In the 1980s, he noticed that many of the important old-time Hawaiian record labels had gone out of business and their releases were out of print. In 1991, [Cord] began leasing the rights to those old recordings and digitally restoring them for reissue. Among the Hawaii record labels Cord brought back to life were Bell, 49th State Hawaii, Mele, Trim, Tradewinds, and Gold Coin."

Another obituary for Michael Cord stated that the 49th State Hawaii Records label was among Cord's first acquisitions. The purchase was made in order to restore, remaster, and re-release the recordings, which by that point were out of print and in poor quality. Cord was quoted in the obituary, stating:
"There was lots of noise-hisses and pops- and we wanted the listening experience to be just like it was when these recordings were brand new- only better."

Recordings

45 rpm

78 rpm

33 1/3 rpm

References

External links 
 The Legacy of the 49th State Hawaii Record label accessed March 31, 2016
 Discogs: 49th State Hawaii Record Co. accessed March 31, 2016
 49th State Hawaii Classic Recordings!  accessed March 31, 2016
 Hawaiian music Collection, University of Hawaii at Manoa Library  accessed March 31, 2016

Pop record labels
American record labels